is a train station in Izumo, Shimane Prefecture, Japan. It is on the Kita-Matsue Line, operated by the Ichibata Electric Railway. Only local services stop at this station.

Lines
 Ichibata Electric Railway
 Kita-Matsue Line

Adjacent stations

|-
!colspan=5|Ichibata Electric Railway

References

Bataden Kita-Matsue Line
Railway stations in Shimane Prefecture
Railway stations in Japan opened in 1915